Harold Utz was an Australian tennis player.

Life
Harold Stewart Utz was born in 1886. He married Gwendoline M Chiplin in 1920.

Tennis career
Harold Utz played some single tournaments and partnered Gwen Utz in mixed doubles. They reached the final of the inaugural Australian Championship in mixed doubles  and lost to Esna Boyd Robertson and Jack Hawkes 6–1, 6–1. Harold Utz and Gwen Utz also competed in mixed doubles in 1925 Wimbledon Championships but lost in the first round. He was nicknamed Barney and was known as H. S. Utz in championships records

See also
List of Australian Open mixed doubles champions

External links
H.S. Utz at Wimbledon

References

Australian male tennis players
1886 births
Year of death missing
Place of birth missing